Labeobarbus parawaldroni is a species of ray-finned fish in the genus Labeobarbus which occurs in western Côte d'Ivoire and eastern Liberia.

References

 

parawaldroni
Fish described in 1987